African Treasure is a 1952 American adventure film directed by Ford Beebe and starring Johnny Sheffield. It was the seventh in the 12-film Bomba, the Jungle Boy series.

Plot
Two unscrupulous geologists force the locals to work in a hidden diamond mine. Bomba, who narrowly avoids being buried alive, rescues them and defeats the villains. Bomba demonstrates some communication skills as a jungle drummer.

There is also some underwater action in the film and a cameo by Woody Strode.

Cast
 Johnny Sheffield as Bomba
 Laurette Luez as Lita Sebastian
 Martin Garralaga as Pedro Sebastian
 Lyle Talbot as Pedro Sebastian
 Leonard Mudie as Andy Barnes
 Arthur Space as Roy DeHaven 
 Lane Bradford as Hardy 
 Smoki Whitfield as Eli

References

External links
 
 
 
 

1952 films
American adventure films
Films directed by Ford Beebe
Films produced by Walter Mirisch
Monogram Pictures films
1952 adventure films
American black-and-white films
1950s English-language films
1950s American films